Worlds Apart is the first album by the Finnish heavy metal band Conquest, released in 1999. The album is known for featuring former Stratovarius drummer, Tuomo Lassila, and then future Nightwish bassist and male vocalist, Marko Hietala. It was recorded and mixed at Seawolf Studios by vocalist, Peter James Goodman, and guitarist, Heikki Warma in early 1999.

Track listing

Credits
Tuomo Lassila – Drums
Heikki Warma – Guitars
Peter James Goodman – Vocals
Marko Hietala – Bass guitars, backing vocals
Pate Kivinen – Keyboards

Guest appearances
Sakari Kukko – Flutes

References

1999 debut albums
Heavy metal albums by Finnish artists